Mohd Faizal bin Abu Bakar (born 20 September 1990 in Kuala Nerang, Kedah) is a Malaysian footballer who plays as a midfielder for Malaysian M4 League side PJ Hiliran. He is known as 'Sepet' among his teammates and fans.

Club career
Born in Kuala Nerang, Kedah, Faizal is a product from Kedah President Cup squad a youth team of Kedah FA. He has been promoted to the first team by Azraai Khor after another Kedah's young talented such as Shakir Ali who left Kedah for Malaysian Young Tigers.

Faizal made his debut for Kedah in a Malaysia Cup group stage match on 15 July 2008 where Kedah thrashed Sabah FA with furious 5-1 result.

In November 2016, Faizal left Kelantan for Malaysia Premier League side Kedah. He made 4 appearances while playing for Kelantan in 2016.

International career
In November 2010, Faizal was called up to the Malaysia national team by coach K. Rajagopal for the 2010 AFF Suzuki Cup. He was in the Malaysia team that won the 2010 AFF Suzuki Cup title for the first time in their history, although he never made any appearances in the tournament. Earlier in February 2010, he received his first appearance for Malaysia in a friendly match against Yemen.

He was also playing for the Malaysia U-23. He was in the squad that competes in the 2010 Asian Games in Guangzhou. He was also in the team that competes for the 2012 Olympic Qualification preliminary round against Pakistan, coming on as a substitute in injury time in the second leg on 9 March 2011.

Career statistics

Club

Honours

International
 AFF Suzuki Cup: 2010

References

External links
 
 
1990 births
Living people
Malaysian people of Malay descent
Malaysian footballers
Malaysia international footballers
Kedah Darul Aman F.C. players
Kelantan FA players
Negeri Sembilan FA players
People from Kedah
Footballers at the 2010 Asian Games
Association football midfielders
Asian Games competitors for Malaysia